The Historical Table of the Copa Sudamericana is a record of statistics of every team that has played in the Copa Sudamericana since its inception in 2002, up to the 2022 season. The list is ordered according to the most points each team has accumulated.

Playing at 2022 edition.

References

Copa Sudamericana
All-time football league tables